Farrukh Habib (born 18 September 1980) is a Pakistani politician who had been a member of the National Assembly of Pakistan from August 2018 till July 2022 and former Minister of State from April 2021 till April 2022, born in Faisalabad. He started his political career by joining ISF (Insaf Student Federation) in 2007. He was President of ISF Pakistan in the past as well as central deputy secretary general of PTI.

Political Career
He was elected to the National Assembly of Pakistan as a candidate of Pakistan Tehreek-e-Insaf (PTI) from Constituency NA-108 (Faisalabad-VIII) in 2018 Pakistani general election.

On 27 September 2018, Prime Minister Imran Khan appointed him as Federal Parliamentary Secretary for Railways.

On 28 April 2021, Prime Minister Imran Khan appointed him as Minister of State for Information and Broadcasting.

Corruption Allegations
Farrukh Habib was summoned by Federal Investigation Agency (FIA) on charges of corruption, fraud, embezzlement and mis-use of power. He is facing the criminal proceeding on offences leading to 10 years imprisonment; if convicted. 

The Anti-Corruption Establishment (ACE) Punjab has launched three inquiries against Pakistan Tehreek-e-Insaf (PTI) leader Farrukh Habib in February 2023.

ACE Punjab summoned Farrukh Habib to investigate his alleged involvement in three corruption cases. Habib had been summoned to Faisalabad on March 11, 13 and 14 2023.

The ACE Punjab officials claimed that Habib ‘illegally’ built a petrol pump on the land of the Railway Department, whereas, he was allegedly involved in corruption during the year 2018 to 2022 in the Department of Parks and Horticulture.

References

Living people
Pakistani MNAs 2018–2023
1980 births